Baat Ban Jaye is a 1986 Indian Hindi-language film directed by Bharat Rangachary, starring Sanjeev Kumar, Mithun Chakraborty, Utpal Dutt, Raj Babbar, Zeenat Aman, Amol Palekar, Aruna Irani  and Shakti Kapoor. This film is Inspired from the 1964 Hollywood film What a Way to Go!.

Plot 
Mr. Singh (Utpal Dutt) lives a wealthy lifestyle in a mansion named 'Ashiana' on 10th Road, Juhu, Bombay, with his only relative, a niece by the name of Nisha (Zeenat Aman), who is unmarried and runs the family's business that faces strong opposition from Khanna Group of Industries. Singh would like to see her marry but she hates wealthy men. So her uncle finds a poor man, Ajay Srivastav, but subsequently finds out that Ajay is already married and also has three daughters; then he decides to get Nisha married to a TV repairman, Yeshwant Bhosle, who ends up being a multi-millionaire after his invention is marketed; then he wants her to marry Viju Guide, a Hyderabad-based Tourist Guide, who finds buried treasure and also ends up a multi-millionaire; then he wants her to marry a motor mechanic, Prakash (Mithun Chakraborty), who, in turn, ends up being the only son of wealthy builder, Jayant Amar Nath, and ends up marrying his sweetheart and neighbor, Rosy. Finally Nisha meets her ideal match in Rukhtapur-based Suraj Singh (Sanjeev Kumar), a wedding singer/dancer, and marries him – not realizing that Suraj is not who he claims to be and she is merely a pawn in a charade that has been created especially to pull wool over her eyes.

Soundtrack 
All songs are written by Anand Bakshi. The soundtrack is available on Polydor/Music India Limited (now Universal Music India).

References

External links 
 
 http://ibosnetwork.com/asp/filmbodetails.asp?id=Baat+Ban+Jaye
 http://www.bollywoodhungama.com/movies/cast/4877/index.html

1986 films
1980s Hindi-language films
Indian black comedy films
Indian comedy-drama films
Films scored by Kalyanji Anandji
Films directed by Bharat Rangachary
1986 comedy films
Indian remakes of American films
Hindi-language comedy films